{{DISPLAYTITLE:C20H28O10}}
The molecular formula C20H28O10 (molar mass: 428.43 g/mol, exact mass: 428.1682 u) may refer to:

 Rosarin
 Rosavin

Molecular formulas